Ahwan Sebastian ( - 2 March 2011) was a playwright, director, music director and actor in Malayalam. Within a career of more than five decades, he has directed six stage plays, and has given music to more than twenty plays and two films (Love Marriage and Karutha Pennu). He has also scripted and directed a film Kalopasana (1981). He is best known as the writer and director of the stage play Devasutram which ran in Kerala theatres for many years. Other notable scripts include Upasana, Brahmasuran, Chooshakamanthram and Anaswaramanthram. His last play, Kabandhangal, was released in 1984. He established his own professional drama group called "Musical Theatres" in 1958.  He died on 2 March 2011 in Kozhikode at the age of 77.

References

 
 "ആഹ്വാന്‍ സെബാസ്റ്റ്യന്‍ അന്തരിച്ചു". (in Malayalam). Mathrubhumi. 3 March 2011. Retrieved 3 March 2011
 
 "Drama director Ahwan Sebastian passes away". IBN Live. 3 March 2011. Retrieved 3 March 2011

Malayalam-language writers
Malayalam-language dramatists and playwrights
2011 deaths
Male actors from Kozhikode
Indian male film actors
Writers from Kozhikode
Malayalam film score composers
Indian theatre directors
1930s births
20th-century Indian composers
Indian male dramatists and playwrights
20th-century Indian dramatists and playwrights
Male actors in Malayalam cinema
Dramatists and playwrights from Kerala
20th-century Indian male writers